Mercedes Carrasco Herrera (9 November 1854) was a Mexican poet and writer. She participated in various cultural and poetic movements and wrote many pedagogical essays which were published in the newspaper La Ley Between 1894 and 1896 she collaborated in the Boletín pedagógico del Estado de México ("Pedagogical Bulletin of the State of Mexico").

She expressed great interest in literary expression and the importance of teaching children proficiency in the language. As an example of this is the following paper published on December 15, 1894 with the title Ejercicios de recitación en las escuelas primarias ("Recitation exercises in primary schools"):

References

1854 births
19th-century Mexican writers
19th-century Mexican poets
19th-century Mexican women writers
Year of death missing